William Theodore Crowell (November 6, 1865 in Cincinnati – July 24, 1935 in Fort Worth, Texas), was a Major League Baseball pitcher in -. He played for the Cleveland Blues and Louisville Colonels. Before coming to the majors he won 28 games for Altoona in 1886.

References

External links

1865 births
1935 deaths
Major League Baseball pitchers
Louisville Colonels players
Cleveland Blues (1887–88) players
Baseball players from Ohio
19th-century baseball players
Memphis Reds players
Nashville Americans players
Altoona Mountain Cities players
Sioux City Corn Huskers players
St. Joseph Clay Eaters players
Burlington Hawkeyes players
Seattle Reds players
New Orleans Pelicans (baseball) players
Austin Senators players
Paris Midlands players
Houston Buffaloes players
Houston Buffaloes managers